Whitemud Drive is a major east–west freeway in southern Edmonton, Alberta, that stretches from 231 Street at the western city limit to Anthony Henday Drive just east of Edmonton in Strathcona County.  The portion in southeast Edmonton from Anthony Henday Drive to Calgary Trail / Gateway Boulevard is designated as Highway 14, and from there until Anthony Henday Drive in west Edmonton is designated as Highway 2.  The portion of Whitemud Drive from 170 Street and 75 Street forms part of the Edmonton inner ring road.

Route description 
At its west end, Whitemud Drive begins at an unsignalized intersection with 231 Street at Edmonton's boundary with Parkland County, and ends in the east at an interchange with the eastern leg of Anthony Henday Drive (Highway 216) at Edmonton's boundary with Strathcona County.  The road is preceded by the western segment of Highway 628 from Stony Plain, and succeeded by an eastern segment of Highway 628 to Highway 21.  It is signed as Highway 2 between the west leg of Anthony Henday Drive and Calgary Trail/Gateway Boulevard, and Highway 14 between Calgary Trail/Gateway Boulevard and the east leg of Anthony Henday Drive.

Over its course, Whitemud Drive passes at-grade signalized intersections at Winterburn Road (215 Street) and Lewis Estates Boulevard/Guardian Road in the west before passing under the western leg of Anthony Henday Drive (Highway 216), to which access is provided via an interchange.

Continuing eastward, access is provided through interchanges at 178 Street, 170 Street, 159 Street, 149 Street (limited access), Fox Drive, 53 Avenue, Terwillegar Drive, 119/122 Street, (Frontage road begins) 111 Street, Calgary Trail/Gateway Boulevard (Highway 2), 99 Street (Frontage road ends), 91 Street, 66/75 Street, 50 Street, 34 Street, 17 Street and the eastern leg of Anthony Henday Drive. Along this portion, Whitemud Drive crosses the North Saskatchewan River on the Quesnell Bridge before Fox Drive, Whitemud Creek (its namesake) before 119/121 Street, Mill Creek before 50 Street, and Fulton Creek after 17 Street. It also passes under a Canadian Pacific rail line before 99 Street and over a Canadian National rail line after 17 Street.

The last recent at-grade intersection to be upgraded to an interchange was 17 Street. The overpass has two lanes open in each direction. The construction was completed in 2013. As a result, Whitemud Drive is now free-flowing within the bounds of Anthony Henday Drive.

Exit list 
From west to east.

References 

Whitemud
Roads in Edmonton